Miss Belgium 2023 was the 55th edition of the Miss Belgium pageant, held on February 11, 2023, at the Plopsaland Theater in De Panne, Belgium. Because of the absence of reigning Miss Belgium, Chayenne Van Aarle, Miss Belgium 2021 Kedist Deltour  crowned Emilie Vansteenkiste of Flemish Brabant at end of the event. Vansteenkiste will represent Belgium at the Miss World 2023 pageant.

The Miss Belgium organisation had to deal with misfortune starting the last week before the event. Reigning Miss Belgium, Chayenne Van Aarle, had a major car accident a few days before the event. She wasn't present at the event because she still had to recover. The event was postponed a few hours before the start because suspicions of a terrorist attack. A suspect was arrested, weapons were found in his car and after the venue was fully searched by the police, the show started with a delay.

Results

Special Awards

Contestants

References

External links

Miss Belgium
2023 beauty pageants
2023 in Belgium